Plague is the second studio album by The Watchmen, released in 1992 by Prescient Thought.

Reception
Westword called the music of Plague "slick and well mastered" and said "keyboards, samples, distorted vocals and titles such as "Fear" prepare you for Skinny Puppy-style aggression; instead, much of the material is caught in the netherworld between modern dance music and accessible industrial beats."

Track listing

Personnel 
Adapted from the Plague liner notes.

The Watchmen
 Boom Fernandez (as Boom Christopher) – production, recording, engineering, backing vocals (A2, A3, A6, A8, B2, B7), keyboards (A3, A7, B1, B3, B4, B5), guitar (A4, A5, A8, B5, B7), lead vocals (A3, A5, B2, B7), noises (A3), phone (B3)
 Dave Mansfield (as Dave Creadeau) – keyboards, production, recording, engineering, lead vocals (A2, A4, A5, A6, A7, B4, B5, B6), sampler (A1, A7, B1, B3, B6), backing vocals (A7, B2, B8), Walkie-talkie (B6)

Additional performers
 Michael Sauter – backing vocals (B5, B7)
 David Secore (as !x! Blaze) – keyboards (A4), synthesizer (B7)

Production and design
 Neil Henderson – post-production, mastering

Release history

References

External links 
 Plague at Discogs (list of releases)

1992 albums
The Watchmen (industrial band) albums